A phot (ph) is a photometric unit of illuminance, or luminous flux through an area. It is not an SI unit but rather is associated with the older centimetre–gram–second system of units. The name was coined by André Blondel in 1921.

Metric equivalence:

Metric dimensions:

Illuminance = luminous intensity × solid angle / length2

See also 

 Illuminance
 Lumen (unit)
 Lux
 Photometry (optics)
 Light

References

External links 
 Knowledgedoor, LLC (2005). Library of Units and Constants: Illuminance Quantity. Retrieved 2006-07-21.
 Illuminance Converter. Retrieved 2006-07-21.

Units of illuminance
Centimetre–gram–second system of units